The Soviet F-1 hand grenade (Russian: Фугасный > Fugasnyy 1, "Explosive, Type #1"), is an anti-personnel fragmentation defensive grenade. It is based on the French F1 grenade and contains a 60-gram explosive charge (TNT). The total weight of the grenade with the fuze is about 600 grams.

"little lemon"). It is also nicknamed Efka for the letter F. It is similar to the American Mk 2 "pineapple grenade", which was also ultimately modeled on the French F-1.

Fuse
The Universal'nyi Zapal, Ruchnaya Granata, Modernizirovannyi]] (UZRGM) (Russian for "Universal Igniter, Hand Grenade, Improved") fuse is a universal Russian type also used in the RG-41, RG-42, RGO-78, RGN-86 and RGD-5 grenades. The standard time delay for this fuse is 3.5 to 4 seconds. However, UZRGM fuze variants are available which give delays between zero (i.e., instantaneous, specifically for use in booby-traps) and 13 seconds. It is possible to hear a loud "pop" as the fuse ignites and begins to burn.

History
The F-1 was introduced during World War II and subsequently redesigned post-war. It has a steel exterior that is notched to facilitate fragmentation upon detonation and to prevent hands from slipping. The distance the grenade can be thrown is estimated at 30–45 meters. Hence, the grenade has to be deployed from a defensive position to avoid self-harm.

Foreign copies
The F-1 grenade has been supplied to various Soviet allies and Third World nations over the years, including Iraq and other Arab nations, and there are different production variations according to country of origin (in terms of finish, markings and spoon/lever design). Though obsolete and no longer in production, it can still be encountered in combat zones.

: Type 1 Grenade.

See also
 List of Russian weaponry

References

External links

 F-1 grenade (Russian)
 Soviet hand grenade F-1 (Russian)
 Information about the World War II-era F-1
 Information about the post World War II F-1

World War II infantry weapons of the Soviet Union
Hand grenades of the Soviet Union
Fragmentation grenades